David Harding may refer to:

Dave Harding (born 1946), English footballer for Wrexham and Australian teams
David Harding (financier) (born 1961), English mathematician and financier
David Harding (artist) (born 1937), Scottish sculptural artist
David Harding, Counterspy, a 1950 film noir crime film
David Harding (bowls), Welsh lawn and indoor bowler

Similar names
David Hardingham (born 1965), a British-based reform activist, aid organiser, entrepreneur
David Harding Getches (born 1942), was Dean and Professor of Natural Resources Law at the University of Colorado